Brezová pod Bradlom is a town in the Myjava District, Trenčín Region, western Slovakia, at the western foothills of the Little Carpathians, in the Myjavské Kopanice region.

History
The territory of Brezová pod Bradlom appears for the first time in written records in 1262. The village was permanently settled in the 15th century or in the first half of 16th century. It was granted the town status in 1709, confirmed in 1966.

Demographics
Brezová pod Bradlom has a population of around 5,000. According to the 2001 census, 92.2% of inhabitants were Slovaks and 0.8% Czechs. The religious makeup was 38.5% Lutherans, 24.9% Roman Catholics, and 22.5% people with no religious affiliation.

Sights

The monumental tomb of Milan Rastislav Štefánik is located on the Bradlo hill (543 metres (1,781 ft), approximately three kilometres from the town, on the road to Košariská. The monument's construction started in 1924, five years after Štefánik's death and was finished in 1928. The tomb was designed by architect Dušan Jurkovič.

Twin towns — sister cities

Brezová pod Bradlom is twinned with:
 Břeclav, Czech Republic 

 Paulhan, France

See also
List of municipalities and towns in Slovakia

References

Genealogical resources
The records for genealogical research are available at the state archive "Štátny archív in Bratislava, Slovakia"

 Roman Catholic church records (births/marriages/deaths): 1733-1910 (parish A)
 Lutheran church records (births/marriages/deaths): 1720-1902 (parish A)

External links

 Town website
Surnames of living people in Brezova pod Bradlom

Cities and towns in Slovakia